Caenby is a hamlet and civil parish in the West Lindsey district of Lincolnshire, England. The population is included in the civil parish of Glentham.

The place name, Caenby, seems to contain an unrecorded Old Norse personal name Kafni, + bȳ (Old Norse), a farmstead, a village, so possibly, 'Kafni's farm or settlement'.
 The place  appears in the Domesday Book of 1086 as Couenebi.

Caenby's Grade II listed Anglican church is dedicated to St Nicholas. A moated manor house, now the Grade II listed Hall Farm House, was a seat of the Tournay family from the time of Edward I to George II. In 1541 Henry VIII slept here while on his Lincolnshire progress. In the 18th century the house was occupied by Lawrence Monck.
 
In 1945 fields adjacent to Caenby were a military Q decoy site, maintained by RAF Hemswell. Dummy plywood buildings, inflatable rubber aircraft or vehicles, and a ploughed faux runway were set up to simulate an active airfield and draw German bombers away from genuine target airfields.

See also
Caenby Corner

References

External links

"Caenby (or Cannby)", Genuki.org.uk. Retrieved 10 July 2011

Villages in Lincolnshire
Civil parishes in Lincolnshire
West Lindsey District